The diocese of Hưng Hóa is a Roman Catholic diocese of Vietnam.

History
François-Marie Savina served in the Hưng Hóa area for 40 years.

The current Bishop is Dominic Hoang Minh Tien.

The creation of the diocese in present form was declared November 24, 1960.

The diocese covers an area of 54,351 km2, and is a suffragan diocese of the Archdiocese of Hanoi.

By 2004, the diocese of Hung Hóa had about 198,000 believers (3.1% of the population), 24 priests and 73 parishes. In 2011, it had 222,647 Catholics, 54 priests, and 191 religious.

Saint Therese of the Child Jesus Cathedral in Trung Son Tay commune (Hà Tây Province) has been assigned as the Cathedral of the diocese.

References

Hung Hoa
Christian organizations established in 1960
Roman Catholic dioceses and prelatures established in the 20th century
Hung Hoa, Roman Catholic Diocese of
2011 establishments in Vietnam